Congolacerta vauereselli, also known commonly as the sparse-scaled forest lizard, is a species of lizard in the family Lacertidae. The species is native to central Africa.

Etymology
Tornier (1902) did not explain the source of the specific name vauereselli.

Geographic range
C. vauereselli is found in Burundi, Democratic Republic of Congo, Rwanda, Tanzania, and Uganda.

Habitat

Reproduction
C. vauereselli is oviparous.

References

Further reading
Greenbaum E, Villanueva CO, Kusamba C, Aristote MM, Branch WR (2011). "A molecular phylogeny of Equatorial African Lacertidae, with the description of a new genus and species from eastern Democratic Republic of Congo". Zoological Journal of the Linnean Society 163: 913–942. (Congolacerta vauereselli, new combination, p. 927).
Spawls, Stephen; Howell, Kim; Hinkel, Harald; Menegon, Michele (2018). Field Guide to East African Reptiles, Second Edition. London: Bloomsbury Natural History. 624 pp. .
Tornier G (1902). "Herpetologisch Neues aus Ost-Afrika". Zoologischer Anzeiger 25: 700–704. (Lacerta vauereselli, new species, pp. 701–703). (in German).

Congolacerta
Reptiles described in 1902
Taxa named by Gustav Tornier